Joel Randal Ward (born December 2, 1980) is a Canadian former professional ice hockey right winger who played in the National Hockey League (NHL) for the Minnesota Wild, Nashville Predators, Washington Capitals and San Jose Sharks.

Early life
Ward was born in North York, Ontario, to Cecilia, who worked as a nurse, and the late Randal Ward, who worked as an automotive mechanic. Both of his parents emigrated to Canada from Barbados. As a youth, Ward played in the 1994 Quebec International Pee-Wee Hockey Tournament with a minor ice hockey team from North York. He also has two older brothers who played hockey in their youth.

Ward graduated from Sir Wilfrid Laurier Collegiate Institute in 1998.

Playing career

Amateur
Undrafted, Ward played in the Ontario Hockey League (OHL) with the Owen Sound Platers. After completing his four-year junior career and his final year of eligibility with the Platers in 2000–01, Ward linked up with lower tier professional team the Long Beach Ice Dogs of the West Coast Hockey League to end the season. An unsigned free agent to start the 2001–02 season, Ward attended the Detroit Red Wings' training camp on a try-out basis, but was ultimately recruited and played collegiately for the University of Prince Edward Island Panthers of the CIS. He received a Bachelor of Arts in Sociology from UPEI in 2006.

Professional

Awarded Rookie of the Year and the Panthers' three-time MVP while earning a degree in Sociology in his four-year collegiate career, Ward was invited to the Minnesota Wild's training camp in 2006. In his first full professional season, he was assigned to the Wild's American Hockey League (AHL) affiliate, the Houston Aeros, signing his first professional contract for the entirety of the 2005–06 season.

After impressing Wild management with his work ethic, Ward earned a two-year contract with Minnesota on September 27, 2006. He debuted in 11 NHL games with the Wild during the 2006–07 season, but spent his time primarily with the Aeros, developing into a responsible, two-way player and improving his points totals in each of his three years.

As a free agent, Ward signed a one-year contract with the Nashville Predators on July 15, 2008. He made the opening night roster out of training camp for the 2008–09 season and scored his first NHL goal in his first game as a Predator against the St. Louis Blues on October 10, 2008.

In 2008–09, his first full NHL season, he scored 17 goals in 79 games, and his reliability as a defensive forward, and success as a utility scoring forward earned him a two-year contract extension on July 1, 2009.

Ward became an unrestricted free agent after the 2010–11 season and subsequently signed a four-year, $12 million contract with the Washington Capitals on July 1, 2011. On April 25, 2012, Ward scored the game-winning goal in overtime in Game 7 of the first round of the 2012 Stanley Cup playoffs against the defending Stanley Cup champions, the Boston Bruins, advancing Washington to the Eastern Conference Semifinals. However, Ward's fortune would not continue into Washington's series with the New York Rangers. With the series tied at two games apiece, Ward took a high-sticking double minor penalty on Carl Hagelin with 22 seconds remaining in the third period of Game 5, with Washington leading 2–1. Rangers forward Brad Richards tied the game with under ten seconds remaining, and defenceman Marc Staal scored in overtime with the Rangers still on the powerplay as a result of Ward's penalty; the Rangers took a 3–2 series lead. After the Capitals' ultimate elimination in the series, Ward required surgery for a sports hernia.

On November 1, 2013, in his 336th career game, Ward scored his first career hat-trick, coming against the Philadelphia Flyers in a 7–0 Washington victory.

In 2014, Ward was selected to represent Canada at the 2014 IIHF World Championship. He started on the team's checking fourth line, but finished as one of the team's top scorers.

On July 3, 2015, as an unrestricted free agent, Ward signed a three-year, $9.75 million contract with the San Jose Sharks.

As the Sharks prepared to play in the 2016 Stanley Cup Finals against the Pittsburgh Penguins, Ward spoke to ESPN, stating that the NHL's first Black player, retired fellow right winger Willie O'Ree, should have his player number 22 retired by the NHL league-wide, just as Jackie Robinson, the first player of colour in Major League Baseball has been honoured—and whom O'Ree had met in person in his own younger years— by having his own player number 42 retired league-wide.

After his contract expired after three seasons, Ward left the Sharks' organization. On September 14, 2018, Ward agreed to attend the Montreal Canadiens' training camp on a professional tryout. However, the Canadiens released Ward from his tryout on September 25.

On April 27, 2020, Ward announced his retirement from professional ice hockey via The Players' Tribune.

On June 8, 2020, Ward became an inaugural executive board member of the Hockey Diversity Alliance, whose goal is to address intolerance and racism in hockey.

Career statistics

Regular season and playoffs

International

See also
 Barbadian Canadian
 List of black NHL players

References

External links

 

1980 births
Living people
Black Canadian ice hockey players
Canadian expatriate ice hockey players in the United States
Canadian ice hockey right wingers
Canadian people of Barbadian descent
Houston Aeros (1994–2013) players
Long Beach Ice Dogs (WCHL) players
Minnesota Wild players
Nashville Predators players
Owen Sound Attack players
Owen Sound Platers players
San Jose Sharks players
Sportspeople from North York
Ice hockey people from Toronto
Undrafted National Hockey League players
UPEI Panthers ice hockey players
Washington Capitals players